Miloš Tintor (born August 21, 1986) is a Serbian footballer, playing for FK Loznica.

Born in Knin, SR Croatia, SFR Yugoslavia, he moved to Serbia at a young age and began playing in the youth team of OFK Beograd.  In 2000, he moved to FK BSK Borča and debuted as senior in 2003. He later played with lower league clubs PKB Padinska Skela, FK Budućnost Valjevo and FK Železničar Lajkovac before signing with FK Radnički 1923 in the summer of 2010.

References

External links
 Miloš Tintor at Utakmica.rs
 

1986 births
Living people
Sportspeople from Knin
Serbs of Croatia
Serbian footballers
Association football defenders
FK BSK Borča players
FK Budućnost Valjevo players
FK Radnički 1923 players
FK Novi Pazar players
OFK Beograd players
Serbian First League players
Serbian SuperLiga players